Ankenes is a former municipality in Nordland county, Norway.  The  municipality existed from 1884 until 1974.  It encompassed most of the present-day Narvik Municipality, surrounding of the town of Narvik which was once its own municipality.  The administrative centre of Ankenes was the village of Ankenesstrand, situated along the west side of the Beisfjorden, where the Ankenes Church is located.  

Today, the name Ankenes is often used to refer to the suburban Ankenesstrand area, just outside the town of Narvik.

History
The old municipality of Ofoten was established on 1 January 1838 (see formannskapsdistrikt).  Ofoten Municipality included all of the land surrounding the inner part of the Ofotfjorden, including the Ankenes area.  On 1 January 1884, Ofoten Municipality was dissolved and split into two municipalities: Ankenes (population: 1,734) and Evindnæs (population: 2,397).  In 1901, the Narvik (population: 3,705) received town status as a kjøpstad.  Soon after, on 1 January 1902, the new town of Narvik was separated from Ankenes to form a separate municipality. The split left Ankenes with a population of 3,023.  On 1 January 1974, the municipality of Ankenes was merged with the town of Narvik to form a new, larger Narvik Municipality.  Prior to the merger, Ankenes had 7,022 inhabitants and Narvik had 12,758.

Name
The municipality (originally the parish) is named after the old Ankenes farm since the first Ankenes Church was built there. The first element is derived from the diminutive form of the old male name  which is short for Arnkell.

Government
While it existed, this municipality was responsible for primary education (through 10th grade), outpatient health services, senior citizen services, unemployment, social services, zoning, economic development, and municipal roads. During its existence, this municipality was governed by a municipal council of elected representatives, which in turn elected a mayor.

Municipal council
The municipal council  of Ankenes was made up of 25 representatives that were elected to four year terms.  The party breakdown of the final municipal council was as follows:

Mayors
The mayors of Ankenes:

 1884–1916: Bertheus Normann
 1917–1922: Peter Leiros (V)
 1923–1928: Hans Peder Seinæs 
 1929–1934: Peter Leiros (V)
 1935–1940: Magnus Edvardsen (Ap)
 1941–1945: Harder Kristiansen (NS)
 1945–1945: Magnus Edvardsen (Ap)
 1946–1967: Ole Andreassen (Ap)
 1967-1971: Henning Eidissen (Ap)
 1972–1973: Edgar Sneve (Ap)

Notable people
Gunnar Emil Garfors (1900–1979), a Norwegian poet
Ola Teigen (1937–1970), a politician for the Norwegian Labour Party
Toralv Kollin Markussen (1895–1973), a politician for the Norwegian Communist Party

See also
List of former municipalities of Norway

References

Narvik
Former municipalities of Norway
1884 establishments in Norway
1974 disestablishments in Norway